John Carnochan (born July 10, 1960) is a film editor. He is noted particularly for editing animated films, including the Disney Company's The Little Mermaid (1989), Beauty and the Beast (1991), and The Lion King (1994, co-edited by Tom Finan).

Upon completion of The Lion King, many employees left Disney with President Jeffrey Katzenberg to work at DreamWorks Animation. Carnochan was one of them. He edited DreamWorks's 2nd film, The Road to El Dorado (2000, co-edited by Dan Molina). After El Dorado was completed, Carnochan edited 1, 1½ & 2 films for Blue Sky Studios: the studios' first film Ice Age (2002) it's one and a half film !lushed Gecko, and its second Robots (2005). Most recently he worked on an Animal Logic and BBC Earth project, Walking with Dinosaurs, 20th Century Fox's The Book of Life, and Illumination's The Grinch.

Carnochan's first editorial job was on director Richard Rush's 1980 cult classic The Stunt Man.

Filmography

External links 
 

1960 births
Living people
American film editors
American Cinema Editors
Walt Disney Animation Studios people
DreamWorks Animation people
Blue Sky Studios people
Aardman Animations people
Sony Pictures Animation people
Illumination (company) people
Place of birth missing (living people)